Sampson "Buddy" Pittman (March 17, 1900 – June 10, 1945) was an American Delta blues guitarist, singer and songwriter. His only known works were recorded alongside fellow Delta blues musician Calvin Frazier by the American folklorist Alan Lomax in Detroit, Michigan in 1938.

Biography
Pittman was born in Joiner, Arkansas, United States in 1900. He was the son of David Pittman and Evelyn (nee Powell) Wellchance Pittman Harrell. It is apparent from his songs "I Been Down in the Circle Before" and "Levee Camp Story", that he worked as a construction hand on the Laconia Circle Levee near Snow Lake, Arkansas as a young man. He lived near Blytheville, Arkansas before moving to Detroit, Michigan around 1936.

Pittman died on June 10, 1945 in Saginaw, Michigan, and was buried in Forest Lawn Cemetery in Saginaw.

1938 recording
Samson was recorded by folklorist Alan Lomax in Detroit, Michigan during three sessions between 15 October – 1 November 1938. During these sessions, Pittman accompanied Calvin Frazier on guitar on twelve recordings and sang on ten of his own original recordings. The Frazier-Pittman recordings were released by Flyright Records in 1980 on the album I'm In The Highway Man. Pittman's tracks alone were compiled into the 1992 album The Devil is Busy by Laurie Records.

Discography
The Devil is Busy, (Laurie Records, 1992)

References

1900 births
1945 deaths
Blues musicians from Arkansas
Songwriters from Arkansas
American blues singers
American blues guitarists
American male guitarists
Detroit blues musicians
Singers from Arkansas
People from Mississippi County, Arkansas
20th-century American singers
20th-century American guitarists
Guitarists from Arkansas
20th-century American male singers
American male songwriters